The Cross River Reservoir is a reservoir in the New York City water supply system located directly east and north of the northern Westchester County, New York, Hamlet of Katonah. It was constructed around the start of the 20th century by impounding the Cross River, a tributary of the Croton River, which eventually flows into the Hudson River.

The reservoir was finally put into service in 1908. The resulting body of water is one of 16 (12 reservoirs and 4 controlled lakes) in the Croton Watershed, the southernmost of New York City's watersheds.

To reach the city, water flows through Cross River into the Muscoot Reservoir, then down that one into the New Croton Reservoir, where it enters the New Croton Aqueduct in Yorktown. Via the aqueduct, it flows into The Bronx, entering the Jerome Park Reservoir.

See also
List of reservoirs and dams in New York

References

External links

Reservoirs in Westchester County, New York
Reservoirs in New York (state)
Protected areas of Westchester County, New York
Croton Watershed